A.X.E.: Judgment Day is an American comic book crossover event written by Kieron Gillen with art by Valerio Schiti, published in 2022 by Marvel Comics. The event involves the discovery of the mutant resurrection protocols and the subsequent conflict between the Avengers, the X-Men and the Eternals.

The event was preceded by a prelude issue titled Eve of Judgment and material from the Free Comic Book Day 2022: Avengers/X-Men issue. Prior to the release of Judgment Day, tie-ins under the banner "Judgment Day is Coming" set up the storyline in the issues of Avengers, Eternals, Immortal X-Men and X-Men. Judgment Day also ties into the limited series A.X.E.: Death to the Mutants, one-shot titles A.X.E.: Avengers, A.X.E.: X-Men, A.X.E.: Eternals, A.X.E.: Iron Fist and A.X.E.: Starfox, and into a number of ongoing series including Amazing Spider-Man, Avengers, Captain Marvel, Fantastic Four, Immortal X-Men, Legion of X, Marauders, Wolverine, X-Force, X-Men and X-Men Red.

A.X.E.: Death to the Mutants #1 was dedicated in memory of Dijjo Lima. A.X.E.: Judgment Day #6, A.X.E.: Death to the Mutants #3, A.X.E.: Starfox, X-Force Vol. 6 #33, and X-Men Vol. 2 #7 was dedicated in memory of Mike Pasciullo. A.X.E.: Iron Fist, A.X.E.: Judgment Day Omega, Captain Marvel Vol. 10 #42, and Fantastic Four Vol. 6 #48 was dedicated in memory of Tom Palmer. The event was released to critical acclaim, with critics praising Kieron Gillen writing, the art, and the action.

Publication history
In December 2021, Marvel Comics posted a teaser "Judgment Day is Coming" that will involve the Avengers, the X-Men, and the Eternals. Judgment Day is announced as a six-issue limited series written by Kieron Gillen debuting in July 2022. The series is a culmination on the plot developments from the last few years: the Avengers’ assembling a powerful lineup at their base in the body of a fallen Celestial called the Progenitor, the X-Men's immortality through the mutant resurrection protocols, and the Eternals’ newfound knowledge about their purpose.

Main characters

Plot

Prelude
After receiving votes from the Uni-Mind after being revived, Thanos successfully takes over the title of Prime Eternal as he kills his uncle Zuras for revenge and murders Druig to prevent his memory of his weakness.

Thanos requires the newly resurrected Druig's help by replacing his old body which The Machine won't allow him to resurrect. During his research with his parent and his Deviant heritage, Thanos visits his grand-uncle Uranos the Undying, who is imprisoned from the Exclusion and questions him about The Machine. Instead, Uranos tells Thanos and Druig his story about the Eternals' three moral principles: Protect Celestials, Protect the Machine, and Correct Excess Deviation. Millenia ago, Uranos argued with Kronos and Oceanus about the principles and decided that eradicating all Deviants and humans, and imprisoning Celestials would provide benefit for all Eternals, which his brothers opposed. His actions in committing genocide of Deviants caused a catastrophic civil war resulting in his 600,000 years imprisonment by his defeat along with Druig's betrayal. After Druig departs, Uranos secretly gives Thanos the imprint key, an armory that allows him to access Uranos' fail-safe into destroying the Machine.

Ikaris, Thena, Sprite, Sersi, and Kingo are shocked to learn that the Machine not only resurrects the Eternals, but also consumes human life and felt distrustful of the Eternals' society. They also discovered that the Deviants of Lemuria were mutated uncontrollably from their unstable genes and the Eternals were forced to activate their Excess Deviation to kill them. After acknowledging Thanos' half-Deviant heritage, the Eternals decide to investigate why the Celestials created them. With Phastos captured by Thanos, the Eternals visit Ajak and Makkari in Celestia and plans to break into the Avengers headquarters and question the Celestial ghost known as the Progenitor.

While Ikaris, Thena, Sprite, Sersi, and Kingo keep the Avengers occupied after the security breach, Makkari activates the Celestial's mind allowing Ajak to confront the Progenitor and questions the Deviants' creation. Ajak is despondent when she finds out that the Celestials created the Deviants as the result of the Progenitors' death releasing noxious Necrofluids that pollute Earth's environment. To prevent all Earth's lifeforms from extinction and Deviants' self-destruct mutation, the Celestials created the Eternals as their backup to prevent their extinction which allows the Deviants to adapt to the Necrofluid's toxicity resulting in stable lifeforms. Eternal scientist Domo confirms his results that his genes are elusively inconclusive despite his parent's heritage and Thanos realizes that his Eternal and Deviant genes are folly to him, in which the Machine does not recognize him as an Eternal. Thanos plans to activate the fail-safe causing the attention of all Eternals and convincing the Avengers to stop Thanos before it is too late. As Thanos overpowers the Eternals, Druig inadvertently activates Phastos' fail-safe on Thanos' armor for his betrayal, which causes Thanos to die from his mutation. With Thanos disposed of his position, the team decides to leave their Eternal society and support the Deviants in Lemuria to help stabilize their civilization. Druig, now the new Prime Eternal and hoping to unite the Eternals, asks The Machine for locations of excessive deviation. It highlights Lemuria and the island of Krakoa, the mutant nation.

Millenia ago, Uranos and Druig invite Odin to exemplify their principle of Excess Deviation by eradicating mutations and deviancy, which Odin reluctantly tolerates their principles. In the present day, the Avengers fight off against the giant mutated Deviant allowing Ikaris and Sersi to activate their Excess deviation while Druig sets up the plan to infiltrate the mutant resurrection. Meanwhile, Mary Jane Watson gave the public astonishing news about her aunt's recovery from dementia thanks to the Krakoan medicine until she was kidnapped by Moira MacTaggert (who currently has an Omega Sentinel appearance), who was using her to infiltrate the Hellfire Gala for Orchis.

Jack of Knives, one of the four Eternal crime lords, sneaks into Krakoa and discovers the Mutant Resurrection Protocols after witnessing the rebirth of Cyclops. They report it back to Druig, who considers the Mutants of Krakoa to be undergoing excessive deviation because of their immortality.

Meanwhile, on Krakoa, Destiny foresees the upcoming war between the Avengers, X-Men, and Eternals clashing with each other and informs the Quiet Council to defend their immortality.

After discovering the identity of Doctor Stasis, Cyclops confesses to the Daily Bugle news reporter Ben Urich about the Mutant Resurrection Protocol believing it might prevent Orchis' plan on inciting tensions and public backlashes while Emma Frost reveals the truth to Scott about Moira's motives and betrayal. After successfully infiltrating the Hellfire Gala following public news of the Mutant resurrection, Moira meets up with Druig and Jack of Knives and informs them to kill five Mutants who are responsible for resurrecting mutants.

Emma Frost informs the Quiet Council about Doctor Statis who is revealed to be Mister Sinister's clone claiming to be the real Sinister. This forces Nathaniel Essex to flee much to his confusion while foreshadowing the event that might happen.

The Earth (dubbed as The Machine by Eternals) narrates that it is doing fine as humans haven't been disintegrated yet and that the Avengers and the X-Men have some time off due to a lack of villain attacks as it starts to narrate the following information. On Olympia, Druig speaks with Domo on how to eradicate all mutants. Domo has created an anti-matter bomb of prodigious size which they can drop into a node on Krakoa before activating. On Lemuria, Ikaris is doing some work there and gets attacked by a female deviant mutate named Crimson Karlau. Refusing to kill her, he and Sersi managed to contain her. In the Exclusion, the imprisoned Phastos is visited by Druig who notes that his fellow Eternals are hiding in Lemuria. Druig brings in Ajak and Makkari to help with the mind-wiping as Phastos tells them not to comply with Druig. In Celestia, Phastos is shown by Ajak and Makkari that they are making a god. He also mentions how he tried to stop Project Machine which would end the deaths of mankind. After Phastos leaves, Ajak tells Makkari that they are lucky that they didn't introduce their guest, an imprisoned Mister Sinister. As Phastos arrives in Lemuria, Thena speaks to Kro about Phastos' actions and the previous actions of Thanos when Makkari arrives stating that the Eternals have secured plans for the Deviants. Druig checks in with Domo on the finishing touches of the anti-matter bomb. Before Druig can take Domo to a diner in Vancouver, Druig was attacked by something unseen as a voice says "Protect The Machine". The anti-matter bomb activates and starts to go to an undersea location only for Domo to deactivate it. When Druig wonders what happened, Domo states that Krakoa is a sentient being and that it is a part of The Machine. Domo tells Druig that he will think of another method only for Druig to turn down his suggestion. Wanting another way to commit genocide and knowing of an expert on that, Druig goes to the Exclusion to give Uranos a proposition. Uranos quotes "Oh Druig, little Druig. Not even a thousand years on the throne and already so desperate".

Plot
An unknown figure narrates how it is of such power to speak to the reader. In New York, Sersi is talking with Tony Stark about a fight that is going to be happening in a day or two where she complains that the X-Men are doing the revivals that the Eternals mostly do. Suddenly, Sersi gets ambushed by Echo's Phoenix form as Captain Marvel and Thor bring her in. The attack was seen from the treehouse by Cyclops and Jean Grey. As people protest about the X-Men being life-hoarders, Cyclops states to Jean Grey that they can't bring back non-mutants. On Krakoa, Nightcrawler and Mystique speak with Destiny to confirm her prediction of an upcoming war. Destiny seeing the Eternals in her vision, she advises them to gather the Quiet Council. Arriving on Arrako, Nightcrawler meets up with Cable, Magneto, and Storm to inform them about Destiny's latest vision and warn the Arakkis about the threat. At Avengers Mountain, Sersi regains consciousness as Iron Man interrogates her in Avengers Mountain's psychic dead room. Iron Man mentions that a few months ago some Eternals snuck into Avengers Mountain to do some cosmic stuff and he finds out that Thanos led the Eternals recently. While Sersi regretted that Thanos led them, Iron Man figured out that the Eternals had another doomsday device. Captain America then comes in to take part in the interrogation reminding Iron Man that Sersi was once an Avenger at some point and that the team should show her some trust. He wants to know why the Eternals are going to war with the mutants. She asks what they know about what Druig is going to do. Iron Man mentioned a huge spike in the Pacific Ocean as Sersi states that she had no involvement in what happened there and is not the Eternal that they should be worrying about. One hour earlier on Olympia, Druig discusses with the Eternal council and figures out that the X-Gene came from the Deviants and not the humans as he tries to get the Uni-Mind to bring fire and death to those that need to be corrected, which the Eternals society all agreed. At the Exclusion, Druig speaks to his grandfather Uranos about what he had told the Uni-Mind about his speech and is planning to have him released as a test. Uranos states that Druig "will see what Uranos the Undying can do with an hour". At the Damocles Foundation's corporate HQ in Los Angeles, Moira hears from Druig about Thanos meeting Uranos and his plan on assassinating the Five. At Krakoa, the Quiet Council is informed about Destiny's vision and the Eternals' upcoming war. During this meeting, Professor X, Hope Summers, and other mutant telepaths are psychically attacked by the Uni-Mind which allows the Eternal fleets to assault the Krakoans which was part of their distraction. This enables Jack of Knives to lead an attack on Krakoa as Wolverine gives the order to sound the alarm. The X-Men joins the others in the assault. At the Great Ring, Nightcrawler gets a warning out to the Arraki. Wolverine finds that Egg has been taken down by Jack of Knives as Wolverine orders Jean Grey to have the Five secured as the Eternal fleets suddenly retreat. When Moira states to Jack of Knives blew his chance, Druig states that the "Eternals are eternal" and he also informs Moira that Arakko has already been taken care of, despite his failed attempt. As the X-Men work to revive their fallen comrades, Nightcrawler explains to them what happened to Arrako as Uranos was shown to have decimated Arakko's homeworld and massacred a few of Arakki's mutant lives, which includes destabilizing all Krakoan gates. He returns to the Exclusion to inform Druig that he completed his hour while hearing about the Eternals' mission. At Avengers Mountain, Captain America, Iron Man, and Sersi hear about what happened on Krakoa. Druig broadcasts himself to the people of Earth on their high-tech devices stating that the Eternals will help them deal with the "mutant threat" while advising them not to be afraid of the towering death machines that have emerged off the western seaboard of the United States which he describes as the Hex which are giant-sized Eternals consisting of Phebe Reginax, Rheaka Centaurus, Syne the Memotaur, Thieaka the Harpiscus, Tetytrona 3000, and the Themex. In retaliation, Captain America assembles the Avengers. As Captain Marvel states that Sersi is locked up, Captain America states that she has no involvement with Druig as Iron Man is informed of an intruder alert. Iron Man flies to the location to find Ajak, Makkari, and a bound Mister Sinister where Ajak wants Iron Man's help to build a god to end the upcoming war. When Iron Man asks how they are going to make a god in a few hours, Ajak states that they have everything they need around them as it shows the outside of Avengers Mountain. The unseen figure narrates that they will find out who this hero is in one way or another.

As Druig's declaration of war is echoed across the world, we see different people at the time of this as the narrator describes them. In London, a man named Tom is getting ready to go to sleep. In Vancouver, a woman named Katrina fires out a supportive tweet at a coffeehouse, hoping that the retweets would be a shield above Krakoa. In Mumbai, an old man named Arjun lies in his bed and shrugs off the Hex. In São Paulo, a woman named Daniela is riding her bicycle knowing the pros and cons of being a mutant. In New York, a woman named Jada notes that people wanting genocide on the mutants are not her people. In Yokohama, Kenta sees his parents worrying about a tidal wave hitting them. The narrator states that these people are important. On Krakoa, Syne the Memotaur fights Exodus and Jean Grey and Exodus gets Syne the Memotaur off of Krakoa. Cyclops is fighting Rheaka Centaurus as he notes to Jean Grey that he generates his attack fauna. In the nick of time, the Avengers show up to help fight the Hex. Back at Avengers Mountain, Iron Man, Ajak, and Makkari work to regenerate their base where Iron Man states that Mister Fantastic is going to be as green as Hulk when it happens. A captive Mister Sinister claims that Ajak and Makkari kidnapped him because they feel he is responsible. Back on Krakoa, Captain America and Cyclops go over the objectives that involve getting the non-combative mutants to the safety of the Vaults and making sure the Five aren't harmed. Cyclops tells Captain America to handle the Hex while the X-Men handle keeping the Five safe. Captain Marvel leads Echo, Star Brand, Thor, Storm, and others into battling Thieaka the Harpsicus and Syne the Memotaur as Captain Marvel notes that something that big can't be intangible all the time. The resulting battle formed a tsunami that is en route to the Philippines, New Guinea, and the eastern coasts of the United States. As Mystique shoots at Themex, Nightcrawler rants that this is unfair as Destiny notes that they stand alone. The narrator notes how Iron Man and Ajak have found the thumbprint of Arishem the Judge, Mister Sinister and his clones found a fragment of the Dreaming Celestial, Makkari obtained the fragments of the Destroyer, Sersi gathering the Eternals who oppose Druig's decision, and Tony Stark will pilot Avengers Mountain like he did when a king wreathed in black attacked Earth. Phebe Reginax appears on Krakoa to aid Syne the Memotaur by healing her. Exodus sacrifices his life to take down Syne the Memotaur. The Five are heavily guarded as they bring back Exodus and the other fallen mutants. In another location, Syne the Memotaur is revived. Meanwhile, Tom is watching the news of the conflict on Krakoa, Katrina is still tweeting, Arjun dies on the street as a side effect of the Machine resurrecting Syne the Memotaur, Daniela comforts a customer at her third job as a tremor hits, Jada still doesn't want any Eternal-based protests against mutants, and Kenta gets a blurred shot at a tidal wave being punched by Captain Marvel. Phastos puts in the last of the demiurgic conductors. Mister Sinister breaks up an argument between Iron Man and Ajak so that they can prevent the mutants from being slaughtered. While slaying Rheaka Centaurus' attack fauna, Jean Grey gets a status report from Cyclops that the vaults are secured and the X-Men have breached the Eternal armories to cut the Hex's power supply. Nightcrawler notes that Syne the Memotaur has returned to bring Krakoa down. This causes everybody to work to take down Syne the Memotaur as there is not enough time to evacuate everyone. As Avengers Mountain comes to life as the Progenitor, who is revealed to be the narrator as it commands the Hex to leave. The Hex complies with their principles and takes their leave from Krakoa. Despite the heroes' success in banishing the Hex, the Progenitor regained consciousness and declared their Judgement Day after showing its disappointment with the people of Earth for their unrelenting cruelty and unreasonable bickering. The Progenitor addresses the people of Earth stating that they will be judged within the next 24 hours to justify themselves individually and collectively. If there is more than wicked, they will live. Otherwise, there will be no tomorrow. The Progenitor concludes that the people of Earth are all important.

As the Progenitor continues its narration, Ajax assumes that what the Progenitor has decreed must be a test. The Progenitor judges Captain America and deems him a failure for each day in North America is worse. In London, Tom is listening to Captain America's podcast in a pub. In Vancouver, Katrina missed Captain America's broadcast and catches the highlights later. In Mumbai, Arjun's widow Komali sees Arjun's body and says negative comments about the Progenitor. In São Paulo, Daniella has a moment of empathy as her mother messages her to get home. In New York, Jada is on her couch watching the news as she acts sincere towards it. In Yokohama, Kenta tries to come up with an excuse to avoid homework as his father claims that he might be judged on how he does it. In The Exclusion, Uranos speaks with Druig about the Progenitor's decree as he mentioned to have sent Jack of Knives to observe the Avengers. Uranos states that both of them have failed to justify themselves as Druig gives the order to prepare the Hex for the second attack. Iron Man discusses a plan with the Avengers, Ajax's group of Eternals, and Mister Sinister on any plans to disable the Progenitor by taking out the internal node as Phastos claims that it would be a big risk while Mister Sinister asks Destiny if she can hear him. On Krakoa, Professor X falls to an attack as Emma Frost informs the Five to revive him. Destiny calls a meeting with the Quiet Council of Krakoa where she informs them that Mister Sinister has discovered a weakness on the Progenitor that must be hit. Destiny, Sebastian Shaw, Exodus, Mystique, and Hope Summers are for it while Emma Frost abstains. The X-Men are surprised when Kro shows up with Ransak the Reject and other Deviants stating that they are with them as they share the same genes enough to pass through the Krakoan gates. Back at the Progenitor, Ajak finds that infiltrators have breached the divine boundary as Mister Sinister claims that billions won't die. As the Eternals principles of Protecting Celestials are activated, Wolverine and Jean Grey arrive with some mutants to target the internal node. When Jean Grey attacks the internal node despite Iron Man's attempt to stop her, everyone ends up in the Progenitor's mind as it made everyone taste the experience of annihilation. The Progenitor then demands that the people of Earth justifies themselves as they thought they their heroes were "gods above judgment". It passes negative judgment for Emma Frost, Mystique, and Destiny, gave Kro a positive judgment, and considers the others longer. As Ajak is prevented from attacking Mister Sinister, Iron Man states that now have no choice as Phastos states that they will have to do things that will enable them to get a positive judgment from the Progenitor by pulling the whole world together. At the Exclusion, Jack of Knives is persuaded by Sersi to release Starfox from his cell.

The Progenitor narrates that Captain America is trying to end the riots near one of the Krakoan areas in New York as he claims that they will get through this. He gets attacked by the rioters. At Avengers Mountain, Sersi speaks with Starfox about using his emotion-manipulation abilities to help get positive judgments upon connecting to the Machine. He is reluctant to do as they would get negative judgment from the Progenitor. In London, Tom is given negative judgment after an encounter with two other angry men. Mayor Luke Cage is visited by the Progenitor using the illusion of a man from the press when asked how he judges his performance. He quotes "Ask me tomorrow" and heads out into the streets causing him to receive negative judgment by default. The Progenitor observes Thor fighting Themex in Earth's orbit and claims that he must be worthy. Eros meets with mutants and talks philosophy with them. The Progenitor appears in the form of Captain Marvel before Ms. Marvel giving her and her family the opportunity to leave Earth. She attacks the fake and asks what she did with the real Carol as it vanishes upon receiving positive judgment. In Vancouver, Katrina heads to a rally when she sees the Progenitor in the form of her dead aunt as she is horrified to see her with her thumbs down. The Progenitor appears in the form of Legion to speak to a revived Professor X who is busy and passes negative judgment which he does not notice. In Mumbai, the Progenitor appears at the foot of Kamali's bed and watches her weep as the Progenitor questions itself. Eros speaks with Black Panther and other known rulers on what they wish to talk about. Starbrand fights an aspect of a dungeon god and receives positive judgment. In São Paulo, Daniella watches little of Captain America's footage and has a moment of awful understandings of how bad this is as she receives positive judgment while on her way to her mom's house. The Progenitor appears before Doctor Doom and asks him to say that Reed Richards is smarter than him. He just laughs about and leaves as the Progenitor gives him positive judgment. In New York, Jada watches the crowd chanting "death to the mutants" while she quotes "death to ourselves" from within as she receives positive judgment. Daredevil sees the Progenitor in a vision of Jesus with a crown of thorns and a down-turned thumb as the Progenitor claims that Daredevil is weeping under his mask. Eros is shown at the White House as he listens with empathy while judging himself as a failure. Miles Morales sees the Progenitor in the form of Spider-Man giving him a thumbs up as Miles gives him a thumbs up back. In Yokohama, Kenta is still not doing his homework causing the Progenitor to withhold judgment. Starfox speaks before the United Nations asking them to let the Mutants and the Eternals help the world. As he leaves the stage, he is approached by Sebastian Shaw who asks if he speaks for the Eternals. Back at Avengers Mountain, Iron Man, Starfox, and Sersi talk about what to do with Druig as Ajak states that their best shot is to continue communing with the Progenitor as they find out what Uranos did on Arakko. As the Uni-Mind had made Druig a compromise candidate, Sersi hopes that Druig will make a mistake that they can use before he makes the mistake where nobody survives. As Druig states that they can bring even the Hex into the Uni-Mind to unleash its war form, Uranos states he is still waiting to be released as Druig declines. He orders the Eternals to unleash the Uni-Mind. The X-Men witness its arrival as the Eternals arrive to merge with the Uni-Mind. They confront Druig there. Deep inside the Machine, Ikaris and Gilgamesh disable the Uni-Mind's firewalls allowing the Eternals to bring X-Men telepaths into the Uni-Mind as Sersi leads the people into voting for Starfox. Uranos manipulates Druig realizing that he has no other choice but to order the Machine to release Uranos. Uranos is unleashed on Olympia as the Eternals confront him with Starfox now called the Prime Eternal. Just then, portals open up from Uranos' armories around the world ranging from drones in France, incandescent beams from a dead sun in Australia, and Druig is grabbed by Exodus where he admits that he made a mistake. Ikaris and Gilgamesh are trapped inside the Machine that Uranos has sealed as Uranos has defeated them. Iron Man enlists Magneto and Storm to activate one of the portals to Uranos' armory. Once that was done, Magneto and Storm confront Uranos buying Iron Man time to hack into the portals enabling one of the armories to weaken Uranos. As Magneto starts dying in Storm's arms as he gets a glimpse of the Progenitor, Ikaris mentions that Uranos is back in his cell telekinetically reassembling himself. The Progenitor then judges Ikaris and Sersi where he gives positive judgment to Ikaris and negative judgment to Sersi. Starfox then persuade the Progenitor as he states that the world is still trying to fight its problems while planning for peace in the future like the mutants making Mars habitable. The Progenitor makes the final judgment as it unleashes a beam that starts to kill the rioters that Captain America was dealing with, Captain America quotes "We're going to die".

The Progenitor has begun its sentencing. In London, Tom is confronted by his son who decides to tell him who he is. In Vancouver, Katrina thinks of her own judgment and heads out into the burning streets. In Mumbai, Komali waits. In São Paulo, Daniela is by her mother's side. In New York, Jada sees a field of bones and a man with a flag. In Yokohama, Kenta realizes what is happening is real and is consoled by his parents. Back in New York, Jada finds Captain America as they talk about their respectful failures. Nightcrawler appears stating that they need Captain America to give the "false god" a piece of his mind. Upon being teleported to the Progenitor by Nightcrawler, Captain America has a word with Progenitor and how the Avengers have fought for justice. The Progenitor reduces Captain America and Nightcrawler to bones. With Nightcrawler is reborn on Krakoa, Jean Grey states that the Worlds' anger is directed. Professor X speaks with Bishop, Cyclops, Iron Man, Jean Grey, Sersi, and Starfox on the next approach. When everyone suggests that they risk going for the node, Destiny states that there is their only chance "with certain modifications". The Avengers, the X-Men, the Eternals and the military then attack the Progenitor where the military and the Hex provides the distraction, Emma Frost pilots Phebe Reginax, and the Stepford Cuckoos pilot each of the Hex. The Progenitor manages to defeat many of his opponents by massacring them forcing others to retreat. The Progenitor then causes destruction around the world and even manages to preventing a shuttle from retreatment. Iron Man and the survivors work on coming up with a new plan as the Progenitor is integrating itself with the Machine as they managed to revive Cyclops, Jean Grey, and Wolverine. As the team sneak into the Progenitor, Jack of Knives provides a distraction by taking a hit from the Progenitor. As the others prepare one more egg, they are caught by surprise when Captain America comes out of it.

During the end of the world, Jada is rescued by Captain America and taken to where everyone on Earth is being kept safe as the Progenitor narrates that it isn't over yet. In London, Tom perishes in the fire upon being distrusting of the portal in the street. In Vancouver, Katrina goes to comfort a woman in a burning building as the fire reaches them. In Mumbai, Komali thinks of Arjun. In São Paulo, Daniella drags her mother into the portal. Jada meets Kenta who states that he doesn't know where his parents are. The Progenitor narrates that the Machine is resisting its attacks. Nightcrawler informs Starfox that Phastos' resetting of the Machine has given them some time as his A.I. colleagues are working to keep the Machine from self-destructing. Captain America states that they should change tactics. The Progenitor narrates that he has part of Tony Stark in him as he opens part of the Earth in order to get to the Reality Loom. Captain America and Nightcrawler note that when the Reality Loom goes, so does Earth. Inside the Progenitor, Iron Man, Jean Grey, Mister Sinister, Wolverine, Ajak, Sersi, and Makkari fight their way past the Celestial Antibodies as they reach the core. As Jean Grey makes her move on destroying the core, Ajak stopped her. Starfox gives the orders to get control of the Armories of Uranos as the Progenitor arrives at Olympia. Everyone is given different weapons as they try to hold off the Progenitor. Captain America tries one more time to get the Progenitor to surrender. The half-recreated Syne the Memotaur with Exodus' support arrives and lunges towards the Progenitor. Ajak explains that if the mutants are revived, a lot of humans won't be. The Progenitor narrates where it sees that Orchis is helping out after having originally helped the Eternals start a war with the mutants. The Progenitor's core personality then attacks them stating that they have failed its tests. Sersi has the Machine broadcast her message stating that the revival of an Eternal will cost the life of a human, much to everyone's horror. Starfox confirms Sersi's speech to Captain America and Nightcrawler. As Sersi attempted to persuade the Progenitor's core personality, it vanquishes Sersi believing that the truth won't save humanity due to their resentful backlash towards her but Iron Man states it that humanity can change similar to the Eternals. Ajak claims that this is also a test for the Progenitor. Having shown sympathy to Progenitor's anguish and despair, Jean Grey even mentions what had happened to her when the Dark Phoenix decimated the D'Bari's homeworld affected her while Iron Man has worked to make amends to deal with his consequence and learned his virtue of heroism. After being told that it's not a god, the Progenitor's core personality confesses that he had given up on saving humanity and asks Ajak if it was. Ajak shamefully gives it a thumbs down for disapproval and it asks her to be better. This causes the Progenitor to shut down and entire Earth restored. With Sersi confirmed dead, Iron Man, Jean Grey, Mister Sinister, and Makkari find that Ajak has been transformed into a new Eternal merged with Celestial body renamed herself as Ajak Celestia as she plans to make herself worthy to the Eternals and act as their new god. In London, a revived Tom and his family as he has a hard time finding the right words to say to his son. In Vancouver, Katrina is greeted in the street with cheers. In Mumbai, Komali meets the unfinished Syne the Memotaur who apologizes for stealing Arjun's life force. In São Paulo, Daniella gets a message from her mom. In New York, Jada gets out of bed after getting a message on her phone that surprises her. In Yokohama, Kenta tells his parents about his visit to Olympia. Starfox makes Zuras the Prime Eternal again and has him apologize on TV to the X-Men about the war the Eternals did on the mutants. As an act of reparation, the X-Men will make use of Uranos for an hour to do with what they will. Druig is incarcerated where he finds that Uranos is his cellmate as he states that he will show him something that can be done in the next thousand years. Zuras states to Storm that he has more conservative interpretation on mutants than Druig and he won't have the Eternals go to war with them again as they share the same DNA type with both Deviants and humans alike. With Sersi exposing the Eternals' resurrection to the public, Starfox was surprised to face public backlash against Eternals while Nightcrawler assures that he will endure it. Jean Grey watches a commercial that she films stating that it will take time to revive the mutants that were killed and will also aid some nations. The Phoenix Foundation is established as a body independent from Krakoa and will experiment in reviving non-mutants as seen when a kid emerges from an egg in front of his parents. Cyclops states to Jean Grey that this is a win for the X-Men and wish it wasn't the win for Orchis. At the Progenitor's dormant body, the Avengers get used to living in their base again with Iron Man and Captain America discusses their aftermath from their Judgement. Captain America meets up with Jada where he had owed her coffee and confirmed that the world isn't perfect as much as they expected. The Progenitor's narration states that the humanity has failed its test and assures that Ajak Celestia can become a worthy god and continue her judgement to the world declaring that every day is a Judgement Day.

Subplots

Immortal X-Men
There is a flashback to Exodus' early life. In the present, the Quiet Council of Krakoa discuss as Destiny states that Professor X is about to share some new information he learned from Forge. he learned from Forge that Celestial energy was detected and that Mister Sinister was abducted by some Eternals as Exodus assumes that he was "rescued". As Emma Frost plans to brief the captains to go on the defensive, Sebastian Shaw suggests that they go on the offensive. Exodus brings up a much earlier encounter with the Eternals due to his immortality. He recounts his encounter with Apocalypse in Ancient Egypt, his life during Medieval England where he encountered the Black Knight of that time, and his long sleep until Magneto found him. This reminiscing is interrupted when the Uni-Mind attacks. During the attack, Wolverine informs the Quiet Council on what happened to Egg and that the Eternals are going after the rest of the Five. Exodus recalls his fight with what appears to be a five-headed dragon. Once the attacking Eternals have retreated, Mystique is carrying Destiny as she advises that they get their telekinetic carpenter to get the furnishing repaired as Jean Grey goes on the offensive. The Quiet Council of Krakoa find out about Druig's speech and the revealing of the Hex. Exodus advises Jean Grey to get everyone to safety as he goes to fight two of the Hex that are heading their way.

Destiny receives Mister Sinister's information about the Progenitor judging them and its "off button". Following the Progenitor's illusion, Destiny is judged by the Progenitor for lying about how she achieved her gift and her fear of losing Mystique which results in a negative judgment. The Quiet Council talk about the Progenitor judging all of Earth as Colossus asked Emma Frost on why she did not vote to attack. When Emma asked if anyone else on the Quiet Council had been tested, Kitty Pryde stated that she passed even though she did not know what she did to get the Progenitor's positive judgment. Professor X asks that the Quiet Council does not bloody the hands of Krakoa if he dies again. Nightcrawler, Colossus, Storm, and Exodus have not received their judgment yet while Mystique and Destiny mentioned that they received negative judgment. After flashing back to his childhood, Sebastian Shaw states that they should do something as Storm states that she must go back to Arrako to deal with the machines that Uranos left. As the rest of the Quiet Council make their plans to win the Progenitor's favor, Exodus gets a vision of a Black Knight which led to a demon appearing causing Sebastian Shaw to snap him out of it. As Sebastian Shaw makes his plans, the Progenitor uses a vision of Emma Frost to give him negative judgment even though he assumed that Emma Frost was responsible. At the Hellfire Club, Sebastian Shaw meets with Starfox about saving the children. In the basement, Sebastian Shaw does a ritual that involves squishing a heart to summon Mother Righteous.

During the meeting of the Quiet Council of Krakoa, Professor X mentions that Magneto is dead and that they can't return him without disrespecting his legacy. Nightcrawler mentions about Starfox becoming the Prime Eternal while promising some reparations. When Mystique notes that Destiny has been quiet, she states that she is petrified. When the final judgment had been passed, Mister Sinister suggests that churn up some Magneto clones and send them against the Progenitor to see if "it will crack". Nightcrawler teleports Destiny away from Mystique to know what she isn't telling everyone. After being told what he wants to know from Destiny, Nightcrawler heads to New York City where he finds Captain America and Jada talking as well as finding an article on if humanity can survive the mutants. While teleporting Captain America to the Progenitor, Nightcrawler secretly obtains Captain America's blood sample and hands it off to Magik. Then it shows Captain America and Nightcrawler being killed by the Progenitor and Nightcrawler being revived on Krakoa. Nightcrawler meets up with Professor X and Rachel Summers as they ask for some volunteers to stay behind and trick the Progenitor while everyone else evacuates Krakoa. As Egg stays behind while his eggs are evacuated, Nightcrawler holds Mister Sinister at swordpoint for making a crack at Egg. Mystique and Destiny are among those who stay behind as the Progenitor attacks Krakoa. As Mister Sinister fails to upload all of his data, Exodus is revived at Avengers Mansion. Then Captain America suddenly emerges from one egg with his shield as he quotes "What now"? After being revived, Nightcrawler makes his way into the Orchis Forge with help from Magik. He takes down Nimrod and confronts Moira MacTaggert's Omega Sentinel form where he uses a Personalized ECM-hunter-killer-virus on her that Forge made to wipe her clean unless she helps him  before the Progenitor destroys the Orchis Forge. As Moira cooperates upon being evacuated from the Orchis Forge, Nightcrawler wants her to help the Earth's A.I. who is in trouble.

X-Men: Red
On Arrako, Abigail Brand informs everyone present about Destiny's precognition of the Eternals' attack. Ora Serrata states that Idyll cannot see the true future. Just then, Uranos arrives stating that he has one hour to correct them. Isca switches sides and kills Idyll. The Armories of Uranos were also activated the moment he left the Exclusion. Those on Arrako go on the defensive where Uranos defeat Ora and fight Legion. Abigail Brand states that she lost contact with Station Two and assumes it was destroyed while noting that there are confirmed attacks all over Mars as Lactuca states that the enemy has machines of death and Sabunar of the Depth notes that this will be a challenge for them. As Cable and Magneto start to go on the offensive, Uranos returns stating that he took down Legion as Lodus Lugos produces metal for Magneto to make use of. The Brotherhood of Arrako led by Sunspot and Wrongslide join the fight against a self-replicating machine army at Argyre Planitia. Nova protects the evacuees at Port Prometheus from their attackers. Nightcrawler fights Isca the Unbeaten in Sobunar's ocean after she chooses to betray the Great Rings of Arakko and murder Idyll for her own survival. Wrapped in metal, Uranos breaks free and punches Magneto through the chest. Witnessing Magneto's defeat, Cable brings out the Omega-One Plus Rifle to use Uranos which does not faze him. Lactuca seals a breach while the Morrowlands start to infect anything organic that comes in contact with it. Xilo unleashes the insects and invertebrates that make up his body in order to attack Uranos. While the evacuations at Port Prometheus have been partially successful, all the Krakoan gates have been destroyed as seven Kymellian priests are killed before Nova can save them. In the markets below, the vendors and their Arrakkii regulars fight to save what they can. Uranos reduces the collective that is Xilo to 13.5% and uses the Omega-One Plus Rifle to shoot Abigail Brand. On the dark side of the planet, the Fisher King feels the wind change. The Arrakki at Aryre Planetia goes on a strategic retreat. After Uranos leaves when the hour is complete, Lodus regains consciousness, Xilo works to put himself back together, and Ora is in the middle of healing. Swearing revenge against the Eternals, Magneto arises with energy in his wound and states to Lodus that they were part of a losing war and that "the seat of loss takes command".

Dr. Craig Marshall of NASA reports on studying the terraforming of Mars as he shows the conflict that is happening on Arrako. He is then visited by Storm, Lactuca of the Stars, and Sobunar of the Depths arrive to fight some of Uranos' drones as Storm creates a thunderstorm. After some of them are defeated, Storm states to Lactuca of the Stars and Sobunar of the Depths that some of Uranos' arsenal had not left when he did. Nova destroys the drone factor above the city to save countless lives. Fisher King prepares to fight. Isca the Unbeaten is slaying a monstrous fish. Wrongslide and the local civilians are fighting the ground machines and Sunspot is destroying some of them. Khora of the Burning Heart is showing fighting some of the ground machines. Wiz-Kid and Cable are trying to get the S.W.O.R.D. space station back online. Professor X is overseeing the revival of Abigail Brand. Lodus Logos and Magneto engage a giant plastic gorilla as Lodus Logos and Xilo watch Magneto slay it by sending one of Lodus Logos' metals into its brain while struggling to stay alive. Sunspot and Fisher King arrive with someone Magneto has not seen as he informs them that Isca killed Idyll and Ora Serrata is wounded. Magneto states that he is growing weaker as the unknown figure introduces herself as Syzya of the Smoke. Magneto is persuaded to let the old ways change as the giant plastic gorilla heals from its fatal injury. As Wrongslide and Khora of the Burning Heart continue their fight against the ground drones that get to its feet, Uthios Stone-Shedder fights the metallic slime as the story-smiths reached into the metallic slime and rewrote it to die or so they thought. Nova finds that one of the drones is evolving. Storm arrives to strike Magneto with lightning. The Arrakii watch in shock as Storm and Magneto combine their abilities to slay the giant plastic gorilla. Sunspot states that they have to find the off switch for Uranos' armories. Storm states that they have to take the fight to Uranos.

In the heart of the Earth, Magneto is on the ground dying after he and Storm have defeated Uranos. He wants Storm to let him pass on despite Storm stating that they can revive him in light of him having no backup data. Magneto has Storm promise him to look after Professor X as their enemies will attack Krakoa one day as he passes on. On Arrako Prime, Lodus Lugos, Sobunar of the Depths, Xilo, and Lactuca of the Stars hear that the Progenitor is judging everyone. Sunspot learns from Ora Serreta that the Seats of Night were dissolved. The remaining Ten Rings condemn Isca for her betrayal which the latter believed that she is willing to win regardless of genocide. After realizing her weakness, Fisher King challenges Isca the Unbeaten through the persuasion of winning or losing. Knowing the loss she experienced, Isca resigns from her position and leaves advising everyone not to follow her where she's going. Storm yields the Seat of All-Around-Us to Lodus and claims the Seat of Loss. At S.W.O.R.D. Station Two, Wiz Kid talks to Cable about the death toll on Arrako. After Abigail Brand was revived, Cable and Wiz Kid talk about their suspicion that Brand killed Henry Peter Gyrich and that they should bring it up with Nightcrawler first.

A.X.E.: Death to the Mutants
Following a recap by the narrator of the actions committed by Druig, Uranos, and the Hex, Ajak, Ikarus, Makkari, Phastos, Sersi, Sprite, and Thena talk about Druig's actions on Lemuria and the reconstruction of the Progenitor. As Ajak persuades Phastos to come with her, the other Eternals go to march into the war while persuading Kro to gain them access to a pit where the gods lashed out the day the Second Host showed up. Once at the bottom, they are confronted by the "shadows of the Firmament". The Eternals fight them and found what the Eternals had been through with the Second Host which they now know when they spoke to Kro about it. As Kro notes that the Eternals will fight Druig while the Deviants will pay the price, he states that the Deviants would be dragged into the war through their own actions. In the Subspace Tunnels, Ikaris visits Gilgamesh. In Olympia's war room, Druig watches the Hex in action while getting a status report. He visits a resurrected Zuras to get a status report on the psychic siege. Zuras states that it is hard as they are going up against the strongest mutant psychics. At the Exclusion, the Oceanic Watch's Kalos the Destructor is confronted by Gilgamesh, Ikaris, and Kingo as Kalos forms an energy Hydra while Sprite uploads a temporary override to Uranos' armory. Kalos is subdued by Ikaris enableing Magik and Wolverine to enter the Machine. Druig finds out what happened and dispatches his defense units to deal with the intruders. Ikaris uses device to send a small part of Zuras' mind into another dimension. Druig and Domo find Zuras on the ground as Druig gets word that Syne the Memotaur is ready for redeployment. At Avengers Mountain, Phastos finishes his part on rebuilding the Progenitor. As the Celestials have given the Eternals three principals, the Progenitor gives them a fourth principle giving the people of Earth to justify themselves. This puts Druig in a difficult situation. Gilgamesh and Ikaris flee from the Droogs while having left a message on the wall stating "Death to the Eternals".

In London, a woman named Sally has been trying to avoid thinking about "Judgment Day" when she somehow got a text from Syne the Memotaur as the Machine narrates about it. On Krakoa, the X-Men are engaging Syne the Memotaur. In Lemuria, Kro is talking with Emma Frost about the Progenitor's judgment and Uranos. Afterwards, Kro leads the Deviants in helping the X-Men fight the Hex. He has Ransak the Reject throw a deformed Deviant in a cage to distract Tetytrona. Kro speaks with Emma Frost more where they bring up the Progenitor's judgment on them as Kro mentioned that the Progenitor passed positive judgment on him using the form of Arishem the Judge who also gives positive judgment to the rest of the Deviants. Druig watches as the Delphan Brothers blame each other he wonders how he will be judged while Uranos claims that he is too early to judge. At Avengers Mountain, Ikaris is prepared to do a Death to the Eternals outcome where he attacked Ajak. Ajak and Makkari restrain Ikaris as the Progenitor declares that Phastos has passed, Makkari has failed, Ajak will be deferred for now, and will consister Ikaris longer. In the Hall of Blades, Sersi persuades Jack of Knives to break out a specific Eternal from the Exclusion. They free Starfox from the Exclusion. Before departing, Starfox speaks to his mother Sui-San who states that the Progenitor has considered her judgment longer. Sally has a vision of her grandmother passing negative judgment on her as she brings it up in a text to Syne the Memotaur who continues to attack Krakoa.

The Progenitor has passed final judgment on Earth with the Machine narrating. On Olympia, Druig has been deposed and Starfox is now the Prime Eternal. Starfox talks with Ikaris, Thena, and Zuras where Starfox mentions that love has failed that they must join with the forces of humanity. While Zuras objects to this, Starfox makes contact with Emma Frost who asks if they are standing together. During the assault on the Progenitor, it slays Syne the Memotaur and Emma Frost as Thena informs them what happened. As Zuras is hit by the Progenitor's attack, Sersi answers Ikaris' question on why she failed her test as Sersi states that she made a mistake. Ikaris goes on the attack and is slain by the Progenitor. The Eternals' resurrection engines fry up as it tries to revive Ikaris and Syne the Memotaur. The Progenitor orders the Machine to activate its self-destruct to destroy the Reality Loom. The Machine objects to this as the Progenitor strikes his weapon into the ground. At Avengers Mansion, Captain America is told of a plan to infiltrate the Progenitor and get to its internal node so that they can blow it up. Captain America then speaks with Nightcrawler and Starfox about saving the remaining humans. Phastos comes in stating that the Machine is nearly compromised. An incomplete Syne the Memotaur emerges from the rubble and texts Sally to inform her that her sisters are dead as she finds that Sally isn't answering. In Lemuria, Phastos goes into the Machine as Kro tells him not to worry about the Deviants and fights its way passed the Machine's defenses so that the Machine can help him. In New York, Exodus confronts Syne the Memotaur as they engage in conversation. At the Heart of the Machine, Phastos finds that the Progenitor has almost compromised the Reality Loom as Phastos resets its system. As Nightcrawler moves his team to shore up his defenses, the Machine tells Phastos that it feels no emotion.

X-Force
Wolverine confronts Krakoa on what happened to Kid Omega as there is no memory in the cradles. Professor X shows up to confront Wolverine who state that there are forces bigger than them at work. In the north pole, Kraven the Hunter is working to survive after the loss of his dogs and the burning of his sled. Kraven the Hunter manages to kill a seal that he fished out. Later that night, a polar bear as it is drawn to a seal corpse so that Kraven the Hunter can hunt it. Once that was done, Kraven the Hunter pulls out a body part of the polar bear and notices some differences. On Krakoa, Deadpool is in a bar talking about how X-Force wouldn't exist without him. Sage gathers Deadpool, Domino, Beast, Black Tom Cassidy, Omega Red as they discuss the protests where the protestors want the X-Men to use their technology to revive the people in their lives who died. They even found an issue in Arches National Park, Utah where they have taken Angel hostage as one of the protestors cuts off one of his wings. Black Tom Cassidy emerges from the gate and drives off the protestors as Domino confronts the one who is holding Angel captive. In the North Pole, Deadpool and Omega Red find a Russian boat. As Omega Red leaves Deadpool to be found by a polar bear, he attacks the Russians on the boat as he frees the captive mutants. In northern Sibera, Kraven the Hunter enters a bar wearing the pelt of the polar bear he killed and a large bag containing Deadpool. He overhears some patrons talking about mutants becoming the apex predator of the galaxy. Kraven says in Russian "What did you say"?

Kraven the Hunter makes his way through an icy valley filled with frozen figures. Then he removes his clothes when he sees the Progenitor. On Krakoa, Black Tom Cassidy reports on the Eternals' attack on Krakoa and a boat heading their way. Omega Red is driving it with some people on board. Kraven the Hunter faces the Progenitor as he carves an X into the palm of his left hand. Back on Krakoa, Sage introduces Omega Red to the Shadow Room to help Omega Red with his killer urges. At Kraven the Hunter's hunting lodge in the Arctic, Kraven the Hunter places Deadpool's head on a hunting trophy. As Kraven the Hunter prepares to hunt the mutants, he is caught by surprise when Deadpool pulls himself back together. At Krakoa's Green Lagoon, Beast and Sage talk about how Krakoa is changing. Meanwhile, Deadpool is suspended from the ceiling as Kraven the Hunter demands that he tells him what he knows about Krakoa. After describing Krakoa, Deadpool classifies himself as an honorary mutant who gave him the keys to Krakoa. Taking advantage of it, Kraven the Hunter takes Deadpool's head to one of the Krakoan gates.

Kraven the Hunter arrives on Krakoa where he eats a glowing butterfly. He finds where the mutants are created as he pulls out a knife. Deadpool's head bites off his tongue. Moments later, Omega Red and Sage find all the backup bodies desecrated and report this to Beast. As Sage suspects that the Eternals are behind this, Omega Red states that the eggs were hacked and stabbed by someone primal. They find Deadpool's tongue as a clue as they start to look for the attacker. Kraven the Hunter hunts Maggott and beheads him. Then he hunts others like a mutant with antlers, a blue-skinned mutant, and a family of tusked mutants. When he subdues Icarus, he gets the answer that Wolverine is the best among them before killing Icarus. When Kraven the Hunter drops Deadpool's head during a fight with Storm, he informs Black Tom Cassidy to carry a message that Kraven the Hunter is on Krakoa. Kraven the Hunter ambushes Beast, rips out his earpiece to keep Sage from contacting him, and takes him captive where he wants to know how the Shadow Room works. Black Tom Cassidy uses the plants and rocks to make Deadpool a new body as he gets into another fight with Omega Red. Wolverine arrives fresh from his encounter with the Progenitor to find that Krakoa is under attack. He follows a blood trail into the Shadow Room where Kraven the Hunter ambushes him and changes the setting to the Savage Land where Wolverine finds a scar-eyed Beast being chased by a Tyrannosaurus.

Kraven the Hunter rides a Tyrannosaurus where he hunts Beast and throws a spear into his right leg. Beast manages to pull out the spear and stab the Tyrannosaurus enough for it to throw Kraven the Hunter off its back. Wolverine slashes his way through some Dilophosaurus as he works to get through to Sage. As he fights some Velociraptors, Wolverine is alerted about the Progenitor' attack which has turned off the safety features of the Shadow Room. As Krakoa is under attack, Sage and Omega Red find Deadpool as they mention that the Pointe has been compromised. Back in the Shadow Room, Kraven the Hunter tracks Beast to a Pteranodon nest as Wolverine catches up to Beast. As the Shadow Room going haywire mutates the Pteranodon, Wolverine slays one as Kraven the Hunter catches up to them. He holds Beast at knifepoint and demands that Wolverine proves to him that he deserves to live more than him. At the Pointe, Sage, Omega Red, and Deadpool find Kraven the Hunter's blade in the console as Deadpool and Omega Red enter the Shadow Room. Wolverine fights Kraven the Hunter as Omega Red evacuates Beast. Deadpool's plant parts start burning up as Sage informs everyone that the Shadow Room is on its way to a structural failure and will collapse upon itself. Wolverine defeats Kraven the Hunter as he is attacked by a Tyrannosaurus. He then proceeds to rescue Deadpool who starts to regenerate his body. After having escaped from the Shadow Room with some injuries, Kraven the Hunter narrates how he has failed this hunt and that he has found the defeated Progenitor. Kraven the Hunter states that the Avengers are currently occupying the Progenitor's body while claiming that everything dies. Kraven the Hunter states that he will be back on Krakoa when it ends to butcher the remains of its mutants and taste the iron of their hearts.

X-Men
As the X-Men fight Thieaka the Harpsicus, Forge is on the beach as he fires a laser that causes Thieka the Harpsicus to be coated in tiny machines that will render it crystalline enough to put it into a state of hibernation. Once that was done, Forge states that he does not have any more nanites as more of the Hex are approaching Krakoa. Jean Grey does a telepathic message to Ikaris who states that the Hex are powerful Eternals deployed from the armories of the Eternals that is beneath the Earth's crust. As non-Eternals cannot access the vault, Ikaris can help the X-Men out in exchange that no Eternals are killed. As Cyclops and Jean Grey help the Avengers hold off the Hex, Iceman grows large and takes Firestar, Forge, Havok, Magik, and Synch into the closest armory beneath the Pacific Ocean. Tapping into Ikaris' mind, Magik teleports her team to him as they work to take out the Hex's energy supply by fighting past the drones. After his right arm is blasted off, Synch used the synching he did with Iceman to grow another arm which he uses to destroy the drone responsible. Then Synch assists Iceman into freezing the engine. Magik allows Forge to take some "souvenirs" from the fallen drones. Magik's group escapes through Limbo before arriving back in Krakoa. As Havok suggests to Magik that they check to see if Blob is alive and the Green Lagoon is still standing, they hear the voice of the Progenitor's demands as it tells the X-Men that their adjudication has begun.

At a newspaper company, its editor-in-chief tells a reporter to lose the "gay mutant hero" story that depicted Iceman helping to disable the Eternals' armory. Some time earlier, a torpedo is shot towards the Sun by an unidentified alien race as they are suddenly attacked by Magik and Cyclops. After interrogating one of the attackers, Cyclops learns that the torpedo that was shot into the Sun was a Flare Generator that will bathe Earth in its flames. Being informed about what is happening, Jean Grey uses her abilities to lift Iceman into the sky where he freezes part of Earth's orbit. Then Jean sends Firestar up to Earth's orbit to deal with the debris. Forge has an idea to Jean Grey on how thick the ice should be. Magik evacuates everyone from the International Space Station as she and Cyclops drop them off in Chicago. The flare makes contact with the ice as Firestar, Synch, and Rogue help to destroy the icy debris. Iceman manages to land safely in Chicago as he does a brief interview with the reporter. Back in the present, the reporter persuades the editor-in-chief to keep the "gay mutant hero" story in. In the Arctic, Cyclops confronts the Progenitor as he requests that it does a change of venue before he can be judged where he might get scolded by his fellow X-Men as Jean is the only one who can judge her. The Progenitor gives Cyclops a positive judgment.

Marauders
In Philadelphia, Pennsylvania, Scratch shows his class a dissected creature as Lockheed watches from above. At the Krakoa Transit, Fabian Cortez talks to Kitty Pryde about recent events as Cassandra Nova is present. At Hellfire Bay, Birdy telepathically speaks with Bishop about his encounter with the Progenitor who spoke through Malcolm and Randall. Then Birdy telepathically spoke with Aurora who mentioned her encounter with a mutant prophet painter named Nemisio Pietri who the Progenitor spoke through. Birdy then telepathically spoke with Tempo who stated that the Progenitor spoke through a sumo wrestler named Jun Tenta. Birdy then telepathically spoke with Psylocke mentioned how the Progenitor spoke through the image of Mister Sinister who claimed that Kwannon could not spare her daughter the wrath of a necromancer. Birdy telepathically spoke with Somnus who mentioned that the Progenitor used an illusion of Northstar to ask why he has not come out. Birdy telepathic speaks with Daken who states that the Progenitor appeared as the voice in his head. Fabian Cortez tells Kitty Pryde that he has finished the Krakoan gate when she hears Aurora's voice stating that it is time to move in on the Progenitor. Meanwhile, Judas Traveller of Orchis begins his plot.

Wolverine
On Krakoa, Wolverine is hunting a strange beast when he encounters what appears to be Moira MacTaggert, Jean Grey, Omega Red, and other people he killed as the Progenitor speaks to him where it wants Wolverine to prove that he is worth more than the lives he has extinguished in 24 hours. In Hell, Hellbride tells her father the Beast of the Hand about the judgment that is being cast on Earth and that it is time for him to leave Hell to cast her judgment on those who killed her beloved on their wedding day and stole the sacred blades that were blacksmith by Muramasa. She plans to get his weapons back and make Wolverine and Solem pay for killing her groom. In San Francisco, riots are occurring as Solem's party is disrupted by Hellbride as the Progenitor speaks to her through the form of the Beast of the Hand stating that she has until the end of the day to make his punishment worthy and swift. At the Summer House on the Moon, Wolverine arrives where he is ambushed by Solem who wants his weapons back. Solem also mentions that Hellbride crashed his party. Wolverine gives him one of Muramasa's blades back in exchange that Solem helps Wolverine kill "a god above" and Wolverine will help Solem kill "a demon below". Hellbride arrives with some Hand ninjas to search for Wolverine and Solem. The Progenitor finds out about the plans of Wolverine and Hellbride as it creates an avatar out of the ice, snow, and water to deal with them.

Wolverine and Solem arrive at the North Pole. Hellbride and the Hand is also at the North Pole as they are attacked in a blizzard. Wolverine and Solem make their way through a maze of ice and snow. Hellbride struggles to make her way through the blizzard. Her body is found by Wolverine and Solem as they leave it by a campfire before fleeing. They are confronted by the Progenitor's arctic avatar wielding an ice sword. Wolverine and Solem fight the Progenitor's arctic avatar as Hellbride joins the battle upon catching up to them. After the Progenitor's avatar is slain, Solem takes his leave with Hellbride as he wants to see what the troublemakers are up to down south. When Wolverine confronts the Progenitor, it gives Wolverine a positive judgment. Sometime later at a bar, Wolverine is shown drinking as it shows defeated patrons on the ground. He recalls how he had defeated anyone that tried to interrupt his drinking. Wolverine also recalls his time when he operated as Patch in Madripoor's Princess Bar. Then he recalls how he has fought alongside Captain America and Blade. Wolverine also recalls his encounter with Flamingeaux in New Orleans. As Wolverine finishes his drink and starts to leave, the bartender pulls out his gun as Wolverine starts to bring out his claws.

Avengers
While walking around covered in red stuff that is not blood, Hawkeye enters a diner and gets the key to the bathroom while ordering two cheeseburgers. After cleaning himself up, Hawkeye encounters the Progenitor in the form of Black Widow where it wants to judge him. The Progenitor explains that humans have become self-destructive as it brings up the different people that pass by this diner. After dining at the diner, Hawkeye gives his final hamburger to a dog tied to a mailbox. Later that day, Hawkeye is watching TV when he gets a call about an alien on the loose in the sewers. He goes to see Mayor Luke Cage as they talk about ethics. Afterwards, he goes to thwart Crossfire's assassination plot. The next day, Hawekeye reads a letter from the Progenitor stating that he has received positive judgment.

Fantastic Four
At the Baxter Building, Mister Fantastic is doing a data cast of the Progenitor's proclamation and a pre-recorded message that mentions that Franklin Richards and Valeria Richards are with Alicia Masters as he prays that their fourth-dimensional fallout shelter will be strong enough. He also mentions that he will be locked in the Think Tank with its Archimedes protocol activated where he will not be able to be contacted from within it. Having received the message, Susan Storm enters the Baxter Building speaks with Harriet and meets a new worker named Zoe Golding. Thing contacts Alicia Masters to inform her that he and the H.E.R.B.I.E.s are battening down the hatches. Human Torch then drives up in his flying car about to go on a pizza run. While in an elevator, Susan introduces Zoe to a custodian named Eduardo. Just then, Exterminatrix and her minions lay siege on the Baxter Building with help from the Mindless Ones. After defeating the hacked H.E.R.B.I.E.s, Susan Storm saves Eduardo from falling as they are confronted by Exterminatrix' minions. Thing fights the Mindless Ones until part of the building falls on him while the Baxter Building's forcefield prevents Human Torch from entering. Susan becomes Invisible Woman takes out some of the minions as one of them puts on a Midas Foundation goggles to detect her heat signatures. Invisible Woman defeats the minion and uses his radio to speak to Exterminatrix as she reveals that she is after the knowledge stored in the Think Tank in order to take the Midas Foundation intergalactic.

As Invisible Woman fights her way through the Baxter Building, Exterminatrix works to have the hacked H.E.R.B.I.E.s break into Mister Fantastic's Think Tank. As Invisible Woman closes in on Exterminatrix, she is told by Exterminatrix that she used the bio-splicers that her father Doctor Midas used in order to create a clone of Noh-Varr called Spaceboy. Outside, reporter Claire Hoffman reports on the Fantastic Four being closed off by a forcefield as Human Torch receives a complaint from a man named Leo who is two hours late for his shift. Human Torch gets an idea and asks Leo if he can borrow his toolbox. Thing is struggling under heavy objects. After being unable to get into the Think Tank, Exterminatrix gives Spaceboy the order to bring Invisible Woman to her alive. Spaceboy uses his acidic tongue to break the forcefield and traps Invisible Woman in a Kree Pocket Battlefield. To Exterminatrix's surprise, Invisible Woman breaks free from the Kree Pocket Battlefield enough to defeat Spaceboy. Exterminatrix breaks into the office where the stockbrokers are where she threatens them if Invisible Woman doesn't surrender immediately. This causes Invisible Woman to surrender to the Mindless Ones. Eduardo rescues Thing from his fate. Upon being brought to Exterminatrix, Invisible Woman fails to reason with Exterminatrix as Invisible Woman is told that her genetically enhanced mercenaries are keeping an eye on the hostages as Exterminatrix wants the password. Invisible Woman states that the Think Tank's passcode is "Imperious Rex". This causes the H.E.R.B.I.E.s to be reset to their programming as they attack the Mindless Ones and free the hostages. Exterminatrix uses a gun that causes Invisible Woman to slowly be transmuted into gold thanks to the bullets that were dipped into Doctor Midas' gold. With help from Leo, Human Torch breaks through the forcefield while Thing also arrives. While using a forcefield on her shoulder, Invisible Woman reveals to Exterminatrix that Doctor Midas' genetic code enhanced by cosmic radiation would not allow him to conceive children where they have records of every villain except for Exterminatrix. This left Exterminatrix shocked at the truth as she surrenders. Later that day, Invisible Woman's injury is treated as Mister Fantastic emerges from the Think Tank as it turns out that he was doing the voiceover narration. After being told about the Progenitor, Mister Fantastic states that he would be judges as a father and a husband and not as a thinker. The Progenitor gives him positive judgment.

A.X.E.: Avengers
Iron Man leads Jean Grey, Mister Sinister, Wolverine, Ajak, Sersi, and Makkari into the Progenitor. After Iron Man mentions to Mister Sinister that the Progenitor killed Captain Marvel and Thor, Ajak states that there are different paths to the Progenitor's destruction node. Just then, the group is attacked by the Celestial antibodies causing everyone to fight their way passed them. Iron Man is then attacked by the Celestial energy and starts to see Ho Yinsen. The Progenitor speaks to Iron Man stating that Ho Yinsen was the first person to die for him as he mentions that he keeps making suits of armor. He then starts to hallucinate seeing a dead Captain America, a dead War Machine, Thor, Hulk, Wasp, Black Widow, Pepper Potts, Hellcat, and the day when Howard Stark and Maria Stark died in a car crash. When Iron Man states that the car crash was not his fault, the Progenitor states that they died because a machine failed them and that they should have been in a better machine. As Iron Man works to fight the hallucination, Howard Stark emerges from the wreck and states that people die while noting that he was not a good father to him growing up. Ajak and Sersi free Iron Man from the hallucination. When Mister Sinster claims that Iron Man made up with his father, Iron Man states that the Progenitor is testing them and they must work to pass the tests.

Amazing Spider-Man
A lot of people are coping with the Progenitor's decree that all will be judged. Peter Parker is on the phone with Iron Man who confirms his suspicions on the Progenitor. He then asks what would happen if someone dead shows up. When Iron Man asks why he asked, Spider-Man quotes "no reason" as he sees a vision of Gwen Stacy. Later, Peter still sees a vision of Gwen Stacy as Randy Robertson needs his help picking out a tuxedo for his wedding to Janice Lincoln. Knowing that he will be judged, Peter goes to help Randy pick out a tuxedo. Then he pays a visit to Aunt May where he fixed her faucet and states that he loves her before checking up on anyone else. After Peter leaves, Aunt May sees a vision of Uncle Ben. Peter then goes to see J. Jonah Jameson who apologizes for the nasty things that he has said about Spider-Man all these years, his use of the Spider-Slayers, his use of Scorpion, and how he abused his power as the Mayor of New York City. As Peter states to Jonah that he has been a good guy, Jonah calls up Robbie Robertson to apologize for having underpaid him. On the rooftop, Peter tells the Progenitor's Gwen Stacy form that Ben Reilly isn't coming when he wanted to apologize. Spider-Man goes to see Miles Morales after he had to subdue Rocket Racer who had flipped his lid at the time when people are taking the Progenitor's judgment better than others. Spider-Man tells Miles how proud he is of him. The next day, Peter goes to work at Oscorp where Kamala Khan is working on a prototype that they prepare to get started as Norman Osborn arrives. After accidentally driving the Progenitor's Gwen Stacy form away by stating to normal that he should not be here for the test run, Kamala states to the Progenitor's Captain Marvel form that he told it that Parker was weird. Peter catches up to the Progenitor's Gwen Stacy form on the roof and states that he would ask himself what the real Gwen Stacy would have thought of him and he lived his life since she died. He states that he has lost someone a while back where not everybody agreed with his tactics while Norman Osborn has helped him. Peter states that it is his responsibility to keep Norman Osborn from becoming Green Goblin while mentioning how Green Goblin killed Gwen Stacy. The Progenitor gives Peter a positive judgment and briefly revives Gwen Stacy to give them a moment to see that beautiful heart of his. Unbeknownst to Peter, Norman has witnessed what happened and tries to keep himself from losing his mind. He is unaware of a Gwen Stacy figure behind him.

A.X.E.: Starfox
Long ago on Titan, Mentor and Sui-San talk about having another child and state that this one must prove that eternal love can flourish. In the present day that is 12 hours before the Progenitor's final judgment, Starfox is given the accelerated extinction event location by the Machine. He works to save lives during the riots and other types of chaos. Long ago on Olympia, Sui-San learns from the Machine that Stardox is now integrated with the Machine. Years ago in Deep Space Party Zone XII, Starfox is visited by a Recorder who states that Thanos has destroyed Titan. Back in the present, Starfox destroys as skull-headed meteor. Sometime ago at the Exclusion, Starfox found himself reborn on Earth after the events where Thanos used Starfox's body to revive himself. After he had been locked up in the Exclusion, Starfox was later freed by Thena and Jack of Knives. Back in the present, Starfox find a man half-buried in the rubble and comforts him in his final moments. Arriving on Olympia, Starfox asks the Machine if he can take the throne and issue the command as the Prime Eternal. Starfox is then confronted by Zuras where he informs Zuras that he is opening the portals and removing the access restriction as the Machine answers his questions when it comes to protecting humanity. Zuras states that his plans are going against the Eternals' traditions. In retaliation, Zuras attacks Starfox stating that his plans will doom everyone while stating that he is starting to act like Mentor as Starfox states to him that he is starting to act like Uranos. After a brief scuffle, Starfox states to Zuras he wants to inspire and that Zuras can rule the Eternals again. Zuras agrees to his suggestion to help save the people of Earth. Starfox appears before the people and states that love will conquer all.

A.X.E.: X-Men
Deep within the Progenitor, Jean Grey informs Iron Man, Mister Sinister, Wolverine, Ajak, Sersi, and Makkari that she can't get any images of what is happening outside of the Progenitor due to its consciousness. Iron Man states that the Celestial is still testing them and that they can find a way to turn back the clock and save everyone. Mister Sinister rambles that they saved lives through the Five on Krakoa. After fighting their way towards the Progenitor's heart, Jean Grey forms a forcefield for everyone to get through while fighting its way past the Celestial antibodies. The Progenitor makes Jean Grey re-experience her first time at the X-Mansion as it takes the form of Professor X while also showing Jean Grey's time as the Dark Phoenix. As the others try to get Jean Grey to snap out of it, Jean Grey re-experiences the Quiet Council of Krakoa's decision to make the Progenitor self-destruct. Mister Sinister and Wolverine snap Jean Grey out of these visions as she starts to go into the Progenitor's mind as it brings Mister Sinister and Wolverine into her mind as character witnesses. Mister Sinister admitted that he once cloned Jean Grey and made something else several times. After Wolverine talks back to it, the Progenitor throws Wolverine and Mister Sinister out of Jean Grey's mind stating that their insight helps with it learning who envies her and who loves her while also mentioning that it met Cyclops. When the Progenitor mentioned how Jean Grey destroyed a world, Jean Grey stated that it was the Dark Phoenix who destroyed the D'Bari's homeworld. Jean Grey states that she has never stopped trying to make up for it and plans to destroy the Progenitor while mentioning how she had went to a casino to save countless world's fates. The Progenitor states to Jean Grey that she can never make up for it as she is the Phoenix "now and forever". After Jean Grey is brought out of her latest vision stating that she has failed as Wolverine comforts her. As the group makes it ways to the stave core, they end up attacked by more Celestial antibodies. Jean Grey uses her abilities to destroy the Celestial antibodies as Wolverine states to Thena that Jean Grey is not used to failing tests.

A.X.E.: Eternals
After Jean Grey had taken down the Celestial antibodies, those with her continue through the Progenitor's body. More Celestial antibodies appear. Iron Man asks Sersi why she failed. In a flashback, Sersi tells Ikaris that he can't tell the humans the reason for how their resurrection process works. The Progenitor then causes Ajak to re-experience when she first met Cetaka and mentioned how she once fought the Prehistoric Avengers where he died so that she can be revived after that disastrous battle. Then she encounters a prehistoric human named Vart who mentions why humans were created. The Progenitor then states to Ajak that a millions years of death was on her hands as it makes her remember all the steps. Ajak works to fight the Progenitor's mind tricks as the Progenitor claims that it is not the Eternals she had to kill to revive him. The Progenitor states that there is such a thing as too much faith. Before ceasing to speak with Ajak, the Progenitor states to her that she will experience the final moment of true freedom. Once that was done, Ajak leads everyone down a shaft.

A.X.E.: Iron Fist
Loki visits his ally Lin Feng in K'un-Lun as the latter and his demon army are sacking the city in search of his master Chiyou's final tomb. Despite Feng's success, Loki notes that Feng is not satisfied, suggesting that he is distracted by thoughts of his brother Lin Lie, the current Iron Fist. Feng threatens Loki, who reminds Feng of a deal they made once Feng conquered K'un-Lun before departing. Meanwhile, Lie is on a flight to Seoul to meet up with White Fox, who still believes Lie had previously perished months before. Loki appears before Lie on the aircraft and informs him of his brother's siege of K'un-Lun. Lie demands Loki to take him to Feng but Loki refuses, mentioning that he is only an observer and musing the outcome of the Progenitor's final judgement of humanity. The Progenitor narrates that Loki is wrong for his lack of concern for the world and for believing he is above judgement, declaring that gods shall be judged along humanity as the aircraft is suddenly destroyed. Lie and Loki safely land but mysteriously find themselves in Asgard, where they witness a memory from Loki's childhood. When a young Loki causes a young Thor to trip into a frozen lake, the present day Loki refuses to help, realizing that the scenario is his judgement from the Progenitor, which he believes he will fail. Duplicates of Mjolnir rain down from the sky with one of them striking Loki and trapping him under the lake. To Loki's surprise, Lie is able to lift Mjonir off of him and carry him to the surface. The two then find themselves in K'un-Lun, where the Progenitor appears as Shou-Lao and challenges Lie to take his heart to officially earn the title of Iron Fist. As Lie struggles against the dragon as he is reluctant to kill Shou-Lao, Loki refuses to help until he is urged to by the Progenitor, who appears to him as Loki's younger self. With Loki's help, Lie is able to defeat Shou-Lao but asks for Shou-Lao to give him his heart instead of taking it. Lie receives the mark of the Iron Fist on his right arm and is given a positive judgement by the Progenitor along with Loki. The two then awaken back on the airplane as if nothing had happened, although the mark still remains on Lie's arm. Lie again demands Loki to take him to Feng but Loki teleports away. The Progenitor appears before Feng as Lie in K'un-Lun and gives him a failing judgement. Lie eventually arrives in Seoul and reunites with White Fox.

Captain Marvel
Captain Marvel and Lauri-Ell are detaining people that are acting like Thanos when they see the Progenitor in the form of their mother Mari-Ell. Captain Marvel had to pull a Hulk in order to shake the ground. Chewie is in Carol Danvers' apartment when the Progenitor appears to it in the form of Captain Marvel. When Chewie catches a mouse, the Progenitor plans to pass judgment on Chewie who lets the mouse go. There is a glimpse at the other tenants like Kit Renner terrified in the bathtub, three roommates keeping their distance from the fight outside, a brokenhearted lady watching television, a boyfriend and girlfriend having a fight, a guy beyond help with some kids, and a man doing his laundry. Chewie teleports the boyfriend out, protects the three roommates from a tire that is heading its way, and comforts Kit. Lauri-Ell states to Captain Marvel that they have to find the source of the infection. Chewie comes out and traces the infection to a creature which it eats. This causes the infected to faint. Captain Marvel sees a vision of Mar-Vell giving her positive judgment. The same outcome happens to Lauri-Ell and Chewie.

Legion of X
On Arrako's Olympus Mona summit, Legion speaks to the Progenitor whose vision appears in the smoke where Legion wants the Progenitor to settle an argument with himself on if he did the right thing. Legion explains about his encounter with Uranos and how Nightcralwer found the Isca the Unbeaten killed Idyll and uses his teleporting to send her to the west of Arrako Prime. Legion then proceeds to mention how he fought Uranos' drones before engaging Uranos. As this was happening, an eel made of fractal embers erased the Outcast Gate as Nightcrawler rescued some people. Legion fights Uranos where they are evenly matched as Nightcrawler was still evacuating Arraki's inhabitants. Uranos notes his awareness of Legion's other personalities and wanting to die for his father as Uranos also mentions that he had many sons of his own through blood or oath who were disappointments do. When Legion starts to attack, Uranos stops him. Legion is saved by Banshee's Vox Ignis form. After Uranos was found to have left, Legion meets up with the others as Magneto turns down Legion's offer to let him accompany Magneto and Storm in going after Uranos. Legion proceeded to hold the line by destroying Uranos' drones until he found out that Magneto sacrificed his life to defeat Uranos. Back in the present, Legion tells the Progenitor how he envied a hero's death as Professor X is shown mourning Magneto's death. When Legion asks if he did the right thing, the Progenitor disappears while giving him positive judgment. Legion comments that the Progenitor knows that Legion rules himself.

Aftermath
In the Temple of Ajak Celestia, Makkari is doing her version of writing to recap Ajak's victory over the Progenitor and Ajak's transformation into Ajak Celestia. After finishing the book, Makkari is told by Ajak Celestia to make the book about heresy. In New York, Sophia Robson is visited by Ikaris and finds herself unable to harm him as Ikaris understands her pain. In London, Sally is visited by Syne the Memotaur who divulges some information to her before returning to the armory while planning to speak to the families of those whose lives were stolen to revive it. After Sally mentioned that she saw the footage of the Hex's fight with the mutants, Syne the Memotaur states that this may be the last time anyone will see the Hex. Sally is told by Syne the Memotaur that if the Hex are unleashed again, it will share its poems with Sally, Sally's children, or Sally's grandchildren. At the Temple of Ajak Celestia, Starfox tells Phastos that he and Zuras are going to apologize in person while planning to have his parents freed. Phastos, Kingo Sunen, Ikaris, Sprite, and Thena meet with Ajak Celestia who mentions that Sersi was a martyr and hopes that there can be a miracle for the Eternals. Ajak Celestia states that she must be a better god and the Eternals have to be better Eternals. She then passes the new Theses on the Principals involving protecting Celestials, protecting the machine, correcting excess deviation, and giving anyone 24 hours to justify themselves. At The Exclusion, Zuras visits Uranos and informs him that the Arakki will have access to his gifts for about an hour at the time and place of their choosing as part of the peace treaty between them. In addition, Uranos will be briefly released to the Arraki for an hour to serve them. Uranos agrees to the terms as he continues killing time by beating up Druig. On Lemuria, Thena visits Kro as he asks if Ajak Celestia will free them from the excess deviation. Thena states that she'll find a way to do that eventually. On Krakoa, Wolverine is visited by Phastos stating that he has carried a message from the Machine to Krakoa before the Machine wiped its own mind. Wolverine takes him to Cypher and Krakoa as Phastos gives Cypher the Machine's message. As they walk away, Phastos informs Wolverine that the Celestials who created the Machine found Krakoa already living upon their arrival where they used it as a template for the Machine. He tells Wolverine that the final message says "Goodbye mommy/daddy/self/other". In New York, Ikaris visits Sophia again while sporting a shaved head. He takes up lodging in her home as he states that he will do everything he can to make it up to the people of Earth. He starts by helping a family on the side of the road with their car trouble. A final narration claims that the Eternals will still protect humans and that the Machine is fully operational with no malfunctions remaining.

Issues involved

Prelude issues

Main series

Tie-in issues

Collected editions

Reception
According to Comic Book roundup, the event received an average rating of 8.4 out of 10 based on 74 reviews.

References

External links
Marvel pages: AXEDTTM2022, AXEEOJ2022, AXEJD2022, AXEJDO2022

Works about judgement
Apocalyptic comics